This article lists important figures and events in Malaysian public affairs during the year 1980, together with births and deaths of notable Malaysians.

Incumbent political figures

Federal level
Yang di-Pertuan Agong: Sultan Ahmad Shah
Raja Permaisuri Agong: Tengku Ampuan Afzan
Prime Minister: Tun Hussein Onn
Deputy Prime Minister: Dato' Dr Mahathir Mohamad
Lord President: Mohamed Suffian Mohamed Hashim

State level
 Sultan of Johor: Sultan Ismail
 Sultan of Kedah: Sultan Abdul Halim Muadzam Shah
 Sultan of Kelantan: Sultan Ismail Petra
 Raja of Perlis: Tuanku Syed Putra
 Sultan of Perak: Sultan Idris Shah II
 Sultan of Pahang: Tengku Abdullah (Regent)
 Sultan of Selangor: Sultan Salahuddin Abdul Aziz Shah
 Sultan of Terengganu: Sultan Mahmud Al-Muktafi Billah Shah
 Yang di-Pertuan Besar of Negeri Sembilan: Tuanku Jaafar 
 Yang di-Pertua Negeri (Governor) of Penang: Tun Sardon Jubir
 Yang di-Pertua Negeri (Governor) of Malacca: Tun Syed Zahiruddin bin Syed Hassan
 Yang di-Pertua Negeri (Governor) of Sarawak: Tun Abang Muhammad Salahuddin
 Yang di-Pertua Negeri (Governor) of Sabah: Tun Mohd Adnan Robert

Events
February – Johore Safari World, Malaysia's first safari park was opened to public.
30 March – Sultan Ismail Petra was crowned as the Sultan of Kelantan
5 June – 8 died in the powerful explosions and fire inferno at Port Klang, Selangor.
10 July – Sultan Ahmad Shah of Pahang was installed as seventh Yang di-Pertuan Agong.
19 July – Malaysia boycotted the 1980 Moscow Olympic Games in Soviet Union.
31 August – Colour television launched in Sabah and Sarawak by Radio Televisyen Malaysia (RTM)
September – The Heavy Industries Corporation of Malaysia Berhad (HICOM) was established.
24 October – The Malaysian Highway Authority was founded.

Births
2 February – Josiah Ng – Track cyclist
1 July – Mizz Nina, Malaysian fashion designer 
15 September – Faiz Khaleed – first Malaysian angkasawan
Unknown date – Qabil Ambak – Equestrian
Unknown date – Lim Keng Liat – Swimmer

Death
20 February – Udo Omar – Malay film actor, known for his role as 'Haji Bakhil' in P. Ramlee's film Labu dan Labi (1962)

See also
1979
1979 in Malaysia | 1981 in Malaysia
History of Malaysia

References

 
Years of the 20th century in Malaysia
Malaysia
Malaysia
1980s in Malaysia